Petri Kokko may refer to:
* Petri Kokko (figure skater) (born 1966), former Finnish figure skater
 Petri Kokko (ice hockey) (born 1975), Finnish ice hockey player
 Petri Kokko (speedway rider), Finnish motorcycle speedway rider